Selçikler is a belde (town) in Sivaslı district of Uşak Province, Turkey. The population of Selçikler is 2002  as of 2011. Selçikler was founded on a hill. During archaeological research carried on between 1966-1978 the hill was found to be a tumulus inhabited during the ancient ages. During the Byzantine Empire the settlement was the town of Sebaste.

References

Populated places in Uşak Province
Towns in Turkey
Sivaslı District